The 1975–76 William & Mary Indians men's basketball team represented the College of William & Mary in intercollegiate basketball during the 1975–76 NCAA Division I men's basketball season. Under the second year of head coach George Balanis, the team finished the season 15–13 and 8–3 in the Southern Conference. This was the 71st season of the collegiate basketball program at William & Mary, whose nickname is now the Tribe.

The Indians finished in 2nd place in the conference and qualified for the 1976 Southern Conference men's basketball tournament at the Greenville Memorial Auditorium in Greenville, South Carolina. William & Mary defeated Furman in the first round before falling to third-seeded Richmond in the semifinals.

Season notes
John Lowenhaupt was named to the First Team All-Southern Conference
Ron Satterthwaite was named to the Second Team All-Southern Conference

Schedule

|-
!colspan=9 style="background:#006400; color:#FFD700;"| Regular season

|-
!colspan=9 style="background:#006400; color:#FFD700;"| 1977 Southern Conference Tournament

Source

References

William & Mary Tribe men's basketball seasons
William and Mary Indians
William and Mary Indians Men's Basketball Team
William and Mary